Izotov is a Russian masculine surname, its feminine counterpart is Izotova. It may refer to famous people such as
Danila Izotov (born 1991), Russian swimmer
Dmitry Izotov (born 1984), Russian association football player
Eduard Izotov (1936–2003), Soviet film actor
Eugene Izotov (born 1973), Russian oboist
Nikita Izotov (1902–1951), Soviet mine worker
Sergei Izotov, (1917–1983), Soviet aircraft engine designer

Russian-language surnames